The Bangladesh Krishak League On 19 April 1972, at the behest of Bangabandhu, eminent lawyer Sirajul Islam Khan was appointed as the convener of the constitution-making committee and founding vice-president of the Krishka League Central Committee and on 15 August, Abdur Rob Serniabat was martyred. Today's position of Bangladesh Krishak League is the result of their tireless work. Krishka League is closely associated with Bangladesh Awami League and is working as one of its affiliated organizations. Samir Chanda is currently the chairman of the Krishak League and Umme Kulsum is the general secretary.

History
The Bangladesh Krishak League was established on 19 April 1972 by President Sheikh Mujibur Rahman. Krishak League joined the national unity government, BAKSAL, formed by President Sheikh Mujibur Rahman. On 15 March 1995 during the Bangladesh Nationalist Party tenure, Bangladesh Police killed farmers when they fired on protesting farmers. The event is commemorated as the Krishak Killing Day by the Krishak League. Rashed Mosharraf, President of the Krishak League, served as the Minister of Land in the First Sheikh Hasina Cabinet.

In 2009, Prime Minister Sheikh Hasina started the Tree Plantation Programme 1416 of the government and gave the implementation of the project to Krishak League. Tofazzal Hossain, president of 7th Ward unit of Krishak League in Pabna, was killed by criminals on 3 October 2010. On 17 July 2018, Seven individuals were sentenced to life imprisonment by a Pabna court. On 16 August 2016,  the secretary of Mollikpur union unit of the Bangladesh Krishak League, Nur Islam Mridha, was killed by individuals associated with Thakur group.

Juned Ahmed, assistant publicity secretary of Sunamganj District unit of Krishak League was killed by criminals on 2 September 2017. On 14 January 2014, Badiuzzaman Badsha, vice-president of Krishak League was expelled for contesting the 10th Bangladesh general election as an independent candidate from Sherpur-2 against Matia Chowdhury. He lost the election to Matia Chowdhury who was the Bangladesh Awami League candidate. Farroque Alam Sarker, Vice President of the Krishak League joined Bangladesh Nationalist Party on 14 November 2018 before the 11th General Election of Bangladesh.

References

Bangladesh Awami League
1972 establishments in Bangladesh
Organisations based in Dhaka
Agricultural organisations based in Bangladesh